Ralph Manza (December 1, 1921 – January 31, 2000) was an American character actor who made over 160 appearances in American film and television shows.

Career
A pre-med student at UC-Berkeley in the early 1940s, Manza was drafted into the United States Army during World War II. He was serving as a medic in the Army when he was assigned to an acting troupe.

The diminutive Manza appeared on daytime television briefly in 1963 as an original cast member of the ABC-TV soap opera series General Hospital, where he played the role of Mike Costello. Manza went on to become a character actor appearing on many primetime TV series in guest role spots, beginning in the 1950s with the TV crime/drama series Highway Patrol, and Alfred Hitchcock Presents.

This part of his acting career continued to flourish through the 1960s, with appearances on such shows as 77 Sunset Strip, McHale's Navy, Perry Mason, The Twilight Zone, Gomer Pyle, U.S.M.C. and Gunsmoke, continuing in the 1970s and 1980s on such series such as Get Smart, My Three Sons, Night Gallery, Police Woman, The Golden Girls, Hart to Hart, Chico and the Man, Barney Miller (in 7 episodes), Benson, Simon and Simon, Night Court, Newhart and on Banacek, co-starring as perpetually puzzled chauffeur Jay Drury.

He went into the 1990s with appearances on the long-running NBC-TV sitcom series Seinfeld, CBS-TV's The Nanny and NBC-TV's Friends. Manza also made appearances in several feature films, perhaps most memorably as the actor playing Hitler in Mel Brooks' 1974 comedy Blazing Saddles ("They lose me after the bunker scene"), and as the fisherman whose scene in the 1998 Godzilla was used as the film's first teaser.

Death
Manza died in January 2000 in Scripps Health-Encintas Hospital in Encinitas, California of a heart attack. He had suffered a heart attack three weeks earlier as well, while filming a commercial for Budweiser

Filmography

China Smith (1954, Episode: "The Manchu Emeralds") as Gluck
Highway Patrol (1955, Episode: "Phony Insurance") as Jenkins
Alfred Hitchcock Presents (1956, Episode: "Safe Conduct") as Waiter
Front Row Center (1956, Episode: "The Human Touch") as Second Waiter
While the City Sleeps (1956) as Newsroom Man (uncredited)
Judge Roy Bean (1956, Episode: "Citizen Romeo") as Gaspano Martini
The Lineup (1957, Episode: "The Juke Box Bandit Case") as Lineup Suspect #2
Hey, Jeannie! (1956-1957, TV Series) as 1st Cabbie / Harry
The Enemy Below (1957) as Lieutenant Bonelli (uncredited)
Gang War (1958) as Bernard "Axe" Duncan
The Hunters (1958) as Major Gifford (Uncredited)
I Married a Monster from Outer Space (1958) as Waiter (Uncredited)
Dragnet (1958–1959, TV Series) as Guest Star
The D.A.'s Man (1959, TV Series) as Al Bonacorsi
Lock-Up (1959, Episode: "Death in the Streets") as Cappy
The Rise and Fall of Legs Diamond (1960) as Bookmaker (Uncredited)
Too Soon to Love (1960) as Hughie Wineman
Sugarfoot (1960, Episode: "Return to Boot Hill") as Glen Hause
Outlaws (1961, Episode: "The Little Colonel") as Colonel
Secret of Deep Harbor (1961) as Frank Miner
Straightaway (1961, Episode: "The Bribe") as Eddie
Target: The Corruptors! (1961, Episode: "Quicksand") as Guest Star
87th Precinct (1961–1962, TV Series) as Cabbie
Surfside 6 (1961–1962, TV Series) as Delcastro / Martinelli
77 Sunset Strip (1961–1963, TV Series) as Dietz / Patsy Coniglio
Perry Mason (1961–1964, TV Series) as Yard Man / Amos Elwell / Dr. Lieberson / Dr. Prince
Ben Casey (1962, Episode: "To A Grand and Natural Finale") as Pino
The Twilight Zone (1962, Episode: "The Dummy") as Doorman
That Touch of Mink (1962) as Cab Driver (uncredited)
The Third Man (1962, Episode: "The Cross of Candos") as Ardo
Going My Way (1962, Episode: "The Crooked Angel") as Charlie
The Dick Powell Show (1962, Episode: "The Sea Witch") as Emile
The Gallant Men (1962, Episode: "Some Tears Fall Dry") as Cafe Proprietor
This Is Not a Test (1962) as Looter
The Untouchables (1962–1963, TV Series) as Max Templar / Jerry
Alcoa Premiere (1963, Episode: "Lollipop Louie") as Uncle Peter
General Hospital (1963-1965, TV Series) as Mike Costello
The Wide Country (1963, Episode: "Yanqui, Go Home!") as Lupo
The Virginian (1963–1964, TV Series) as Harry the Barber
Kisses for My President (1964) as Rizzutti - Mechanic (uncredited)
Dear Heart (1964) as Restaurant Proprietor
McHale's Navy (1965–1966, TV Series) as Angelo Barone / The Gypsy
Laredo (1965–1967, TV Series) as Blue Dog
Batman (1966, TV Series) as Felix
Honey West (1966, Episode: "Slay, Gypsy, Slay") as Putzi
Gomer Pyle, U.S.M.C. (1966, Episode: "Gomer, the Would-Be Hero") as Sam
What Did You Do in the War, Daddy? (1966) as Waiter
Dragnet (1967, Episode: "The Big Explosion") as Gene Ellis
The Ride to Hangman's Tree (1967) as Prisoner (uncredited)
He & She (1967, Episode: "The Coming-Out Party") as Mr. Banaducci
Petticoat Junction (1967, Episode: "Kate's Day in Court") as Pierre
Get Smart (1967–1970, TV Series) as Rico / Finster / Mr. Antonelli / Cart Driver
Gunsmoke (1968, Episode: "Deadman's Law") as Marco;
Three Guns for Texas (1968) as Blue Dog
Family Affair (1968, TV Series) as Waiter / Clerk
The Smugglers (1968, TV Movie) as Batisto
The Outsider (1968, Episode: "There Was a Little Girl") as Charley
Dragnet 1966 (1969, TV Movie) as Eddie Garcia (Uncredited)
Adam-12 (1969–1971, TV Series) as Zizi Martino / Market Proprietor / Frank Standish
To Rome with Love (1969–1971, TV Series) as Paoli / Giotto
The Bold Ones: The Lawyers (1969, Episode: "Shriek of Silence") as Wilfred Fletcher
The High Chaparral (1970, Episode: "Only the Bad Come to Sonora") as Gomez
Insight (1970, Episode: "The Day God Died") as Thomas
Ironside (1970–1971, TV Series) as Al and Emilio
The Love Machine (1971) as Bartender (Uncredited)
My Three Sons (1971, Episode: "Four for the Road") as Cab Driver
Night Gallery (1972, Episode: "The Ring with the Red Velvet Ropes") as Max
Banacek (1972–1974, TV Series) as Jay Drury
The Odd Couple (1973, Episode: "Myrna's Debut") as Tony Mugucci
Cops and Robbers (1973) as Cop #6
Blazing Saddles (1974) as Man Playing Hitler (uncredited)
Police Woman (1975, Episode: "Target Black") as Lombardi
A Cry for Help (1975, TV Movie) as Tony Garafolas
The Wild Party (1975) as Fruit Dealer
Chico and the Man (1975–1977, TV Series) as Hector Gomez
Spencer's Pilots (1976, Episode: "The Prisoner") as Man in Camper
Serpico (1976, TV Series) as Monsignor Rossi / Stefano
The Practice (1976, Episode: "Jules Takes a Partner") as Herman
Terraces (1977, TV Movie) as Nick Parisi
Fish (1977, TV Series) as Jackman
Barney Miller (1977–1982, TV Series) as Leon Roth / Eddie Blake / Anthony Barelli
A.E.S. Hudson Street (1978, TV Series) as Ambulance Aide Stanke
The One and Only (1978) as Bellman
Perfect Gentlemen (1978, TV Movie) as Frankie Fox
The Cat from Outer Space (1978) as Weasel
Love at First Bite (1979) as Limo Driver
Big Shamus, Little Shamus (1979, TV Series) as Lou (Unaired)
Samurai (1979, TV Movie) as Irving Berman
The Apple Dumpling Gang Rides Again (1979) as Little Guy
Benson (1980, Episode: "Takin' It to the Streets") as Crazy
Fatso (1980) as Danny
Little Miss Marker (1980) as Casino Worker
Nero Wolfe (1981, Episode: "Might as Well be Dead")
WKRP in Cincinnati (1981, Episode: "Clean Up Radio Everywhere") as Harvey Green
Soap (1981, TV Series) as Digger
Hill Street Blues (1981, Episode: "Fruits of the Poisonous Tree") as Morris Wine
Simon & Simon (1981, Episode: "A Recipe for Disaster") as Hotel Manager
One Day at a Time (1981–1982, TV Series) as The Bellhop / Guard
CHiPs (1982–1983, TV Series) as Cooper / Hot Dog Vendor
Little House on the Prairie (1983, Episode: "Once Upon a Time") as Hugo
Fantasy Island (1983, Episode: "Revenge of the Forgotten") as Chef Henri
Amanda's (1983, Episode: "I Ain't Got Nobody") as Mr. Ahern
The Facts of Life (1983, Episode: "Help from Home") as Mr. Balducci
The Fall Guy (1983, Episode: "The Chameleon")
Hart to Hart (1983, Episode: "Too Close to Hart") as Leo
Zorro and Son (1983, Episode: "The Butcher of Barcelona") as Waiter
Blue Thunder (1984, Episode: "Trojan Horse") as Willie
Mama Malone (1984, TV Series) as Padre Guardiano
The Philadelphia Experiment (1984) as Older Jim
Cover Up (1984, Episode: "Death in Vogue") as Sergi
Night Court (1984–1992, TV Series) as Angelo / Subway Commuter / Jerome Chapel
Scarecrow and Mrs. King (1985, Episode: "A Little Sex, a Little Scandal") as Flower Shop Owner
Beer (1985) as Frankie's Grandfather
The Golden Girls (1985, Episode: "The Competition") as Augustine Bagatelli
Crazy Like a Fox (1985–1986, TV Series)
Newhart (1985–1990, TV Series) as Bud
The Twilight Zone (1986, Episode: ""Cold Reading"") as Sol (segment "Cold Reading")
Mama's Family (1986, Episode: "Where There's a Will") as Leonard P. Finstadtler
Highway to Heaven (1986, Episode: "Basinger's New York") as Charley Carthy
Retribution (1987) as Amos
Matlock (1987, Episode: "The Doctors") as Mr. Lipman
Beauty and the Beast (1987, Episode: "Siege") as Old Man #1
Knots Landing (1987, Episode: "Noises Everywhere Pt. 1") as Bereaved Man
Growing Pains (1988, Episode: "The Mom Who Knew Too Much") as Izzy
Punky Brewster (1988, Episode: "Christmas Hero") as Santa Claus
Hooperman (1989, Episode: "Rashomanny") as Manny
Have Faith (1989, Episode: "The Competition")
Nearly Departed (1989, Episode: "Grandpa's Date") as Ralph
Santa Barbara (1989–1992, TV Series) as Father Sierras
Anything But Love (1990, Episode: "Three Men On a Match")
Doogie Howser, M.D. (1990, Episode: "Whose Mid-Life Crisis Is It Anyway") as Charlie Wilson
Murder, She Wrote (1990, Episode: "The Sicilian Encounter") as Father Anselmo
The Fanelli Boys (1990, Episode: "Pilot") as Sicilian #2
9 1/2 Ninjas! (1991) as Old Man
Who's the Boss? (1991, Episode: "The Road to Washington Pt. 1") as Francis
The Fresh Prince of Bel-Air (1991, Episode: "The Butler Did It") as Bob Doomie
Get a Life (1991, Episode: "Chris Becomes a Male Escort") as Henry Gardner
Sisters (1992, Episode: "The Bottom Line") as Saul
Mission of Justice (1992) as Mr. Lazar
Dave (1993) as White House Barber
Seinfeld (1993, Episode: "The Cigar Store Indian") as Gepetto
Lookin' Italian (1994) as Manza
The John Larroquette Show (1994, Episode: "Grit") as Rudy
The Nanny (1994, Episode: "Everybody Needs a Bubby") as Saul Kanasal
Silk Stalkings (1994, Episode: "Reluctant Witness") as Gussie DiBarto (Uncredited)
Madman of the People (1995, Episode: "Truths My Father Told") as Street Person
Home Improvement (1995, Episode: "A House Divided") as Sam
Northern Exposure (1995, Episode: "Little Italy") as Cesare Trapani
Get Shorty (1995) as Fred the Barber
Mad About You (1995–1996, TV Series) as Saul Campanella
Sister, Sister (1995–1996, TV Series) as Floyd and Frail Man
Tracey Takes On... (1996, Episode: "Law") as Old Juror
Her Last Chance (1996, TV Movie) as Pawnbroker
The Home Court (1996, Episode: "Love, Death, & Soda") as Thin Man
Dave's World (1996, Episode: "L.A. Times") as Mervyn
Hollywood Boulevard (1996) as Janitor
Living Single (1997, Episode: "He's The One") as Old Man #1
Alright Already (1997, Episode: "Again with the Jessica's Boyfriend") as Superfly
Grace Under Fire (1997, Episode: "Vega$") as Condo Resident
Godzilla (1998) as Joe 
Charmed (1998, Episode: "I've Got You Under My Skin") as Elderly Man
Viper (1998, Episode: "Family Matters") as Anton Pollard
Friends (1999, Episode: "The One With Rachel's Inadvertent Kiss") as The Old Man
Can't Be Heaven (1999) as Anzio
What's Cooking (2000) as Uncle David
Boy Meets World (2000, Episode: "I'm Gonna Be Like You, Dad") as Uncle Morrie
The Tangerine Bear (2000) as Factory Worker / Rico (voice) (final film role)

References

External links 

1921 births
2000 deaths
20th-century American male actors
American male television actors
American male film actors
American people of Italian descent
Combat medics
Male actors from San Francisco
Military personnel from California
United States Army personnel of World War II
United States Army soldiers
University of California, Berkeley alumni